Max Frederick Smallcombe (born 27 March 1999) is a Welsh professional footballer who plays as a midfielder for Bideford.

Club career
Smallcombe came through the Exeter City Academy to make his first-team debut on 30 August 2016, in a 4–2 defeat at Oxford United in an EFL Trophy group stage match. He turned professional at Exeter in April 2017, having successfully captained the youth team to a league title in the 2016–17 season.

He started the 2017–18 season on loan at Southern League Division One West club Bideford. He scored his first goals in senior football with a brace on 2 September, helping the "Robins" to a 5–1 victory over Bishop's Cleeve in an FA Cup qualification match at The Sports Ground. Manager Sean William Joyce went on to praise his professionalism, stating that he was badly missed by the team after he picked up a hamstring injury in September.

On 28 September 2019, Smallcombe returned to Bideford.

International career
Smallcome made his debut for the Wales under-17 team in a UEFA European Under-17 Championship qualification victory over the Netherlands at Dragon Park on 22 October 2015, and went on to win a total of four caps.

Career statistics

References

1999 births
Living people
Sportspeople from Truro
Welsh footballers
Wales youth international footballers
Association football midfielders
Exeter City F.C. players
Bideford A.F.C. players
Tiverton Town F.C. players
English Football League players
Southern Football League players